This is a list of underwater divers whose exploits have made them notable.
Underwater divers are people who take part in underwater diving activities – Underwater diving is practiced as part of an occupation, or for recreation, where the practitioner submerges below the surface of the water or other liquid for a period which may range between seconds to order of a day at a time, either exposed to the ambient pressure or isolated by a pressure resistant suit, to interact with the underwater environment for pleasure, competitive sport, or as a means to reach a work site for profit or in the pursuit of knowledge, and may use no equipment at all, or a wide range of equipment which may include breathing apparatus, environmental protective clothing, aids to vision, communication, propulsion, maneuverability, buoyancy and safety equipment, and tools for the task at hand.

Who is an underwater diver? 

This list refers to people who are notable for their underwater diving activities and for whom a biographical article exists in Wikipedia. 
The following lists may also be relevant:

Pioneers of diving 

  (1891–1974) helmet diving
  (1891–1930) helmet diving
 
  – French inventors of the first anthropomorphic armoured diving suit
  – Inventor of an unsuccessful early scuba system
 
 
  – Italian inventor of a diving bell used for archaeological work on the Roman ships of lake Nemi
 
  (1908–1977)
 
 
 
 
  (1946–) wreck diving
 
 
  (1919–2013) underwater photography
  – Inventor of an adjustable automatic exhaust valve for variable volume dry suits
  – Diver who test dived the first successful atmospheric diving suits
 
 
 
  
  (1952–1993) wreck diving
 
 
 
  diving medicine, diver training
  – Inventor of the neck dam for lightweight helmets
 
 
  (1947–) underwater archaeology
 
  (1905–2002) skin & scuba diving
  (1909–1941) inventor of human torpedo

Underwater explorers

Underwater scientists, environmentalists and archaeologists

Freedivers

Scuba divers

Surface supplied and saturation divers

Underwater filmmakers

Underwater photographers

Underwater artists

Combat divers, frogmen and saboteurs

Aquanauts

Cave divers
 (1907–2000)
Jon Lindbergh – Pioneering American cave diver and early aquanaut (1932-2021)
 
 (1949–1994)
 (1951–)
 (1969–)
 (1977–2011)
 (1909–2001)
 (1958–2010)

 (1961/2–)
 (1971–)

Notable for other reasons
(to be allocated) 
  (born 1971)
  (shipwreck discovery)
 (shipwreck discovery)
 
 
 
  (1974–1994)
 
 
 
 
 
 
 
  (shipwreck discovery)

See also

Footnotes 

Outlines of sports
Underwater divers
Underwater divers